Kjerringøy Church is a parish church of the Church of Norway in Bodø Municipality in Nordland county, Norway. It is located in the village of Kjerringøy. It is one of the two churches for the Kjerringøy og Rønvik parish which is part of the Bodø domprosti (deanery) in the Diocese of Sør-Hålogaland. The white, wooden church was built in a long church style in 1883 using plans drawn up by the architect J. E. Olsen. The church seats about 300 people and it has one worship service every three weeks.

History
The earliest existing historical records of the church date back to the year 1589, but the church was not built that year. It may have been built in the 14th or 15th century. In 1763, records show that an old church building was torn down in Kjerringøy and those records show that that church had been built by the residents from "time immemorial". After that, a new timber church was built that had a long church design with a choir and sacristy in the east. There is an existing photograph of this building from around 1860. In 1883, the church was torn down and replaced with the present building.

Media gallery

See also
List of churches in Sør-Hålogaland

References

Churches in Bodø
Churches in Nordland
Wooden churches in Norway
19th-century Church of Norway church buildings
Churches completed in 1883
14th-century establishments in Norway
Long churches in Norway